The Lion of Belfort, in Belfort, France, is a monumental sculpture by Frédéric Auguste Bartholdi, the sculptor of the Statue of Liberty (Liberty Enlightening the World).

Overview 
Finished in 1880, it is made entirely of red sandstone. The blocks it is made from were individually sculpted, then moved under Belfort castle to be assembled. Twenty-two meters in length and 11 meters in height, the colossal work dominates the local landscape.

The lion symbolizes the heroic French resistance during the Siege of Belfort, a 103-day Prussian assault (from December 1870 to February 1871). The city was protected from 40,000 Prussians by merely 17,000 men (of whom only 3,500 were from the military) led by Colonel Denfert-Rochereau.

Instead of facing Prussia to the east as was intended, the statue was turned the other way following German protests.

Smaller editions stand in the center of Place Denfert-Rochereau in Paris and in Downtown Montreal — Lion of Belfort (Montreal).

Gallery

See also 
 List of tallest statues

References

External links 

Sculptures of lions
Outdoor sculptures in France
Buildings and structures in Belfort
Mountain monuments and memorials
1880 sculptures
Monuments and memorials in France
Stone sculptures in France
Sandstone sculptures
Sculptures by Frédéric Auguste Bartholdi
Colossal statues